Gulf County Schools is a school district headquartered in Port St. Joe, Florida, United States. This district serves all of Gulf County and the City of Mexico Beach in Bay County.

Schools

High schools
 Port St. Joe High School (Port St. Joe) (tiger shark)
 Wewahitchka High School (Wewahitchka) (gator)

Middle schools

Elementary schools
 Port St. Joe Elementary School (Port St. Joe)
 Wewahitchka Elementary School (Wewahitchka)

References

External links

 Gulf County Schools

School districts in Florida
Schools
Education in Bay County, Florida